Chépica Airport was an airstrip  west of Chépica, a town in the O'Higgins Region of Chile.

Google Earth Historical Imagery (10/24/2011) shows a  grass runway within the arcs of two pivot irrigation systems. The (1/6/2013) and subsequent imagery show the runway boundaries have been removed and the land is under cultivation.

See also

Transport in Chile
List of airports in Chile

References

External links
OpenStreetMap - Chépica Airport

Defunct airports
Airports in O'Higgins Region